The 1993 AC Delco 500 was the 28th stock car race of the 1993 NASCAR Winston Cup Series season and the 19th iteration of the event. The race was held on Sunday, October 24, 1993, in Rockingham, North Carolina, at North Carolina Speedway, a  permanent high-banked racetrack. The race took the scheduled 492 laps to complete. At race's end, Penske Racing South driver Rusty Wallace would manage to dominate the late stages of the race to continue his championship pursuit on driver's championship leader,  Dale Earnhardt, cutting down his lead to 72 points. The victory was Wallace's 30th career NASCAR Winston Cup Series victory and his ninth victory of the season. To fill out the top three, the aforementioned Earnhardt and Junior Johnson & Associates driver Bill Elliott would finish second and third, respectively.

Background 

North Carolina Speedway was opened as a flat, one-mile oval on October 31, 1965. In 1969, the track was extensively reconfigured to a high-banked, D-shaped oval just over one mile in length. In 1997, North Carolina Motor Speedway merged with Penske Motorsports, and was renamed North Carolina Speedway. Shortly thereafter, the infield was reconfigured, and competition on the infield road course, mostly by the SCCA, was discontinued. Currently, the track is home to the Fast Track High Performance Driving School.

Entry list 

 (R) denotes rookie driver.

Qualifying 
Qualifying was split into two rounds. The first round was held on Thursday, October 21, at 2:30 PM EST. Each driver would have one lap to set a time. During the first round, the top 20 drivers in the round would be guaranteed a starting spot in the race. If a driver was not able to guarantee a spot in the first round, they had the option to scrub their time from the first round and try and run a faster lap time in a second round qualifying run, held on Saturday, October 22, at 1:00 PM EST. As with the first round, each driver would have one lap to set a time. For this specific race, positions 21-40 would be decided on time, and depending on who needed it, a select amount of positions were given to cars who had not otherwise qualified but were high enough in owner's points; up to two were given.  If needed, a past champion who did not qualify on either time or provisionals could use a champion's provisional, adding one more spot to the field.

Four drivers would fail to qualify.

Full qualifying results

Race results

Standings after the race 

Drivers' Championship standings

Note: Only the first 10 positions are included for the driver standings.

References 

1993 NASCAR Winston Cup Series
NASCAR races at Rockingham Speedway
October 1993 sports events in the United States
1993 in sports in North Carolina